In Greek mythology, Macelo or Makelo (Ancient Greek: Μακελώ) was one of the Rhodian Telchines. She was the mother of Dexithea by Demonax or sometimes described as the daughter of Damon (Demonax), chiefest of the Telchines.

Mythology 
Because of the insolence of the Telchines, including Macelo and her husband, Zeus struck down all of them or in some accounts, together with her sister Dexithea, were the only survivors of their race. According to other scholia, all except Macelo, who was struck by lightning with her husband at her wedding because Demonax invited all the gods but Zeus.

Callimachus' account 

 And therewithal insolence and a lightning-death, and likewise the wizards the Telchins and Demonax who so foolishly flouted the blessed Gods—these the old man did put in his writing-tablets, and aged Macelo, mother of Dexithea, them twain that alone the Immortals left unharmed when they overturned an island for its sinful insolence.

Scholia on Ovid's account 

 It is said that Macelo and her sisters were daughters of Damon, and that Jupiter having enjoyed their hospitality saved them when he struck the Telchins, of whom Damon was chief, by lightning for maliciously blighting all the fruits of the earth.

Nonnus' account 

 Macello entertained Zeus and Apollo at one table . . . and when Earthshaker (Poseidon) had shattered the whole island (Rhodes) with his trident and rooted all the Phlegyans (Telchines) at the bottom of the sea, he saved both women (Macello and possibly Dexithea) and did not strike them down with the trident.

Notes

References 

 Nonnus of Panopolis, Dionysiaca translated by William Henry Denham Rouse (1863-1950), from the Loeb Classical Library, Cambridge, MA, Harvard University Press, 1940.  Online version at the Topos Text Project.
 Nonnus of Panopolis, Dionysiaca. 3 Vols. W.H.D. Rouse. Cambridge, MA., Harvard University Press; London, William Heinemann, Ltd. 1940–1942. Greek text available at the Perseus Digital Library.

Women in Greek mythology
Rhodian characters in Greek mythology